Francisco Nunes da Rosa (22 February 1871? — 13 September 1946) was a Portuguese Catholic priest, short story writer and journalist.

Biography
Born in Rio Vista, California, United States of America, to Portuguese migrants to the United States, he returned with them, at the age of five, to Madalena, Pico Island. 

Ordained in 1893, he became the parish priest at the Church of Santíssima Trindade in Mosteiro, on Flores Island, post he held until transferring to the parish of Nossa Senhora da Boa Nova das Bandeiras, on Pico Island, in 1896, where he remained until his death. 

While on Flores (1893-6), he wrote Pastorais do Mosteiro (1904) and while in Bandeiras (1896-1946) he wrote Gente das Ilhas.

He died in Bandeiras, Madalena, Pico Island on 13 September 1946.

References

Bibliography
Rosa, Tomás da. (1977), Gente das ilhas de Nunes da Rosa. Vigília, Horta.
Rosa, Tomás da. (1990), Alguns estudos, Horta, Câmara Municipal da Horta.

1871 births
1946 deaths

Year of birth uncertain
Azorean writers
Portuguese journalists
Male journalists
Portuguese male novelists
19th-century novelists
19th-century journalists
20th-century novelists
20th-century journalists
20th-century Portuguese Roman Catholic priests